Heitman is a surname. Notable people with the surname include:

 Betty Heitman (1929-1994), American activist
 Dana Heitman (born 1966), American musician
 Jack Heitman (1906–1977), Australian politician
 Nils Peter Laberg Heitman (1874–1938), Norwegian physician and civil servant

See also
Heitman Analytics
Heitmann